Jan Oblak (born 7 January 1993) is a Slovenian professional footballer who plays as a goalkeeper for La Liga club Atlético Madrid and captains the Slovenia national team. He is widely regarded as one of the best goalkeepers in the world.

Oblak signed for Portuguese club Benfica at the age of 17, and was part of the team that won the domestic treble in the 2013–14 season. In 2014 he moved to Atlético Madrid for a fee of €16 million, becoming La Liga's most expensive goalkeeper at the time. In 2015–16 he won the Ricardo Zamora Trophy for best goalkeeper, conceding an all-time record low of 18 goals. He won the award again in the following three seasons, and for a fifth time in 2021. Oblak was also nominated for the 2017 and 2018 Ballon d'Or awards, following his consistent performances with his club.

With over 350 appearances for Atlético Madrid, Oblak has won four trophies with the club, including the 2020–21 edition of La Liga.

Oblak made his senior international debut for Slovenia in 2012, and has been named Slovenian Footballer of the Year on six occasions.

Club career

Olimpija

Born in the Upper Carniolan town of Škofja Loka, Oblak started playing football at the age of five for his home town club Ločan. At the age of ten, he moved to the Olimpija youth academy, where he remained until the end of the 2004–05 season when the club was dissolved. He then moved to the newly founded Bežigrad, which, after a series of name changes, became Olimpija Ljubljana in 2008. The following year, Oblak rejected a contract from Italian club Empoli in favour of a trial at Fulham, but he eventually did not leave the club and committed his future with a contract extension until 2011. On 17 May 2009, Oblak, aged 16, made his professional debut for Olimpija Ljubljana in the 2008–09 Slovenian Second League in a 7–2 win against Mura 05. Olimpija Ljubljana earned promotion to PrvaLiga for the 2009–10 season as league winners. In the next season, Oblak was the team's main goalkeeper, only missing three league games as the club finished fourth in the league table.

Benfica
On 14 June 2010, Oblak signed a contract with Portuguese club Benfica, who loaned him to fellow top level club Beira-Mar in August 2010. He then joined Olhanense on loan in January 2011, until the end of the 2010–11 season.

Benfica loaned Oblak to another Portuguese team, União de Leiria, for the 2011–12 campaign. He made his league debut on 15 January 2012, in a 2–2 away draw against Nacional. On 29 April 2012, after most of the Leiria squad rescinded their contracts due to financial struggles within the club, Oblak was one of only eight players to take part in the league match at home against Feirense in an eventual 4–0 home defeat.

In July 2013, Oblak failed to present himself for pre-season training, claiming he had no contract with Benfica. Late into the following month, he signed a contract extension until 2018, describing the situation as a "misunderstanding."

After long-time starting goalkeeper Artur made a series of mistakes midway through the 2013–14 campaign, Benfica manager Jorge Jesus dropped him in favour of Oblak, and the latter went on to keep several clean sheets in his first starts, notably in a 2–0 home win against Porto and a 0–0 draw at Juventus in the semi-finals of the UEFA Europa League. He eventually won the league's Best Goalkeeper of the Year award on 6 July 2014.

Atlético Madrid

On 16 July 2014, Atlético Madrid announced they had reached an agreement with Benfica for the transfer of Oblak, pending a medical examination. Atlético paid €16 million for the Slovenian player, making him the most expensive goalkeeper in La Liga history. Oblak moved to Madrid on a six-year deal as a replacement for Thibaut Courtois, who had returned to play for his parent club Chelsea following his loan expiration. During his presentation, on 22 July 2014, Oblak said, "I don't come to replace anyone. I come as another player. I'm here along with the rest of the players and goalkeepers. I'll do everything in my power to defend this shirt and achieve great results this season. I will do everything in my hand to help the team."

2014–15 season
Oblak was an unused substitute in his first competitive fixture on 19 August 2014, the first leg of the 2014 Supercopa de España against Real Madrid, with Miguel Ángel Moyà playing instead. He made his debut on 16 September 2014, in a 3–2 defeat away to Olympiacos in Atlético's first Champions League group match of the season. His first clean sheet came in his first Copa del Rey match, a 3–0 win away to L'Hospitalet in the first leg of the last 32 on 3 December 2014. On 17 March 2015, he replaced the injured Moyà in the 23rd minute of a Champions League last 16 second leg against Bayer Leverkusen, and kept a clean sheet in a 1–0 home victory. The tie went to a penalty shootout, in which he saved Leverkusen's first attempt by Hakan Çalhanoğlu in an eventual triumph. Four days later, due to the injury, he made his league debut, keeping a clean sheet in a 2–0 home win over neighbours Getafe.

2015–16 season
In February 2016, Oblak was rewarded with a contract extension through 2021 with a reported release clause of £77.5 million. On 3 May 2016, Oblak saved Thomas Müller's penalty at the Allianz Arena in the second leg of the Champions League semi-finals; although Atlético lost the match 2–1, they advanced to the final on away goals. He was included in the squad of the season of the 2015–16 Champions League. As the domestic season ended, he won the Ricardo Zamora Trophy for best goalkeeper, having conceded 18 goals in 38 games, equalling the 22-year-old record of Deportivo de La Coruña's Francisco Liaño.

2016–17 season
Oblak received attention on 15 March 2017, in a Champions League game against Bayer Leverkusen, where he made three saves in succession to ensure a goalless draw and passage to the quarter-finals. He told UEFA's website: "These are things that happen. Sometimes you save three efforts and other times they score all three."

He was again included in the 2016–17 UEFA Champions League squad of the season and also won the second consecutive Ricardo Zamora Trophy. He was also shortlisted for the 2017 Ballon d'Or, where he finished 26th with 4 votes.

2017–18 season
On 28 January 2018, Oblak played his 100th league game for Atlético when he started the game against Las Palmas. In the 100 league games, he kept 59 clean sheets and conceded only 54 goals. In the 2018 UEFA Europa League Final, Oblak kept a clean sheet as his side won 3–0 against Olympique de Marseille, winning their third Europa League title in eight years. This was Oblak's first European title, having been a runner up twice before.

As a result of his performances, he was included in the Europa League squad of the season. At the end of domestic season, he won the Ricardo Zamora Trophy for a third consecutive time, having conceded only 22 goals in 37 games. He was also awarded the La Liga Best Goalkeeper award for the third consecutive season, hence becoming the first goalkeeper to win the award three times. He was included into the 2018 Ballon d'Or shortlist again, this time receiving two votes as he finished 25th in the final list.

2018–19 season
On 6 November 2018, Oblak kept a clean sheet in a 2–0 home win over Borussia Dortmund in the group stages of the UEFA Champions League. By doing so, he kept his 100th clean sheet for Atlético, a feat which he achieved in 178 official games. On 17 April 2019, Oblak agreed to a four-year contract extension with the club, keeping him at the club until 2023.

At the end of the season, Oblak won the Ricardo Zamora Trophy for the fourth consecutive season, hence equalling the record of Víctor Valdés for most consecutive Zamora Trophies won. He was also awarded the La Liga Best Goalkeeper of the season award for the fourth consecutive time.

2019–20 season 
Ahead of the 2019–20 season, he was named as vice-captain of the team, behind Koke. On 21 October 2019, Oblak was nominated for the inaugural edition of Yashin Trophy, the Ballon D'Or of goalkeepers. He finished in fourth place. On 6 December 2019, Oblak kept a clean sheet in a 0–0 away draw against Villarreal. By doing so, he broke the club record of Abel Resino for most clean sheets with his 96th clean sheet in his 169th league game.

On 11 March 2020, following Atlético Madrid's 3–2 away victory over defending champions Liverpool in the last 16 of the UEFA Champions League, Oblak, playing his fiftieth Champions League game, was awarded the Man of the Match award by UEFA, after making nine saves to help his team progress to the quarter-finals with a 4–2 aggregate victory. On 17 June 2020, Oblak kept a clean sheet in a 5–0 away win against Osasuna, his 182nd league game, and by doing so, became the fastest goalkeeper to achieve 100 clean sheets landmark in La Liga history, breaking an almost 50-year-old record of Miguel Reina who did the same in 222 league appearances. Oblak also became the first non-Spanish goalkeeper to keep 100 clean sheets in La Liga history. On 27 June 2020, Oblak played his 250th game for Atlético as his side beat Deportivo Alavés 2–1. He has reached the milestone just one week after equalling José Francisco Molina as the second goalkeeper with the most appearances in the club's history.

2020–21 season 
In 2020–21, Oblak won the La Liga title with Atlético Madrid. He managed to keep 18 clean sheets in 38 matches, in addition to achieving 80% save rate for the season.

2021–22 season 
On 15 August 2021, Oblak played his 304th competitive match for Atlético Madrid and became the goalkeeper with the most appearances for the club, breaking the previous record of Abel Resino.

International career

Oblak was first called by the Slovenia under-21 team in August 2009, replacing the injured Jan Koprivec. He made his debut against France on 9 September of that year, in the 2011 UEFA European Under-21 Championship qualifiers.

On 11 September 2012, Oblak made his first appearance for the senior side, starting in a 2–1 away loss against Norway in the 2014 FIFA World Cup qualifiers.

He became the first-choice goalkeeper of the national team after the international retirement of Samir Handanović at the end of 2015; however, he took a break from his international duties during the 2018–19 UEFA Nations League, due to an arm injury he had been battling at the time.

On 6 September 2019, Oblak captained Slovenia for the first time.

Style of play
Considered to be one of the best goalkeepers in the world by several pundits, Oblak is a tall, athletic, and physically strong keeper. He is mainly known for his speed, quick reflexes, and agility, as well as his reading of the game, and in particular, his excellent handling and ability to come off his line and collect crosses, which enables him to excel in the air and command his area effectively. He has also been praised in the media for his work-rate, outstanding positioning, footwork, shot-stopping abilities, and composure in goal, as well as his overall consistency, leadership, and ability to instill a sense of confidence in his team's back-line.

Personal life
Oblak was born to a Slovenian father, Matjaž Oblak, and a Bosnian Serb mother Stojanka Majkić. His older sister, Teja Oblak (born 1990), is a professional basketball player and a member of the Slovenia national team.

Career statistics

Club

International

Honours
Olimpija Ljubljana
Slovenian Second League: 2008–09

Benfica
Primeira Liga: 2013–14
Taça de Portugal: 2013–14
Taça da Liga: 2013–14

Atlético Madrid
La Liga: 2020–21
Supercopa de España: 2014; runner-up: 2019–20
UEFA Europa League: 2017–18
UEFA Super Cup: 2018
UEFA Champions League runner-up: 2015–16

Individual
Primeira Liga Best Goalkeeper: 2013–14
La Liga Zamora Trophy: 2015–16, 2016–17, 2017–18, 2018–19, 2020–21
La Liga Team of the Season: 2015–16
UEFA Champions League Squad of the Season: 2015–16, 2016–17, 2019–20
La Liga Best Goalkeeper: 2015–16
UEFA La Liga Team of the Season: 2015–16, 2016–17, 2017–18, 2018–19
UEFA Europa League Squad of the Season: 2017–18
Slovenian Footballer of the Year: 2015, 2016, 2017, 2018, 2020, 2021
Slovenian Youth Footballer of the Year: 2012, 2013
La Liga Player of the Month: May 2021
La Liga Player of the Season: 2020–21
ESM Team of the Year: 2020–21

References

External links

Atlético Madrid official profile

NZS profile 

1993 births
Living people
People from Škofja Loka
Slovenian footballers
Association football goalkeepers
NK Olimpija Ljubljana (1945–2005) players
NK Olimpija Ljubljana (2005) players
S.L. Benfica footballers
S.L. Benfica B players
S.C. Beira-Mar players
S.C. Olhanense players
U.D. Leiria players
Rio Ave F.C. players
Atlético Madrid footballers
Slovenian Second League players
Slovenian PrvaLiga players
Primeira Liga players
Liga Portugal 2 players
La Liga players
Slovenia youth international footballers
Slovenia under-21 international footballers
Slovenia international footballers
Slovenian expatriate footballers
Slovenian expatriate sportspeople in Portugal
Slovenian expatriate sportspeople in Spain
Expatriate footballers in Portugal
Expatriate footballers in Spain